This article shows the rosters of all participating teams at the men's basketball tournament at the 2018 Commonwealth Games on the Gold Coast.

Group A

Australia

Canada

New Zealand

Nigeria

Group B

Cameroon

England

India

Scotland

See also 
 Basketball at the 2018 Commonwealth Games – Women's team rosters

References

External links 
  - Gold Coast 2018 Commonwealth Games Basketball Coverage

rosters